The Diablillos mine is a large silver mine located in the north of Argentina in Salta Province. Diablillos represents one of the largest silver reserve in Argentina and in the world having estimated reserves of 77.1 million oz of silver and 0.6 million oz of gold.

References 

Silver mines in Argentina
Mines in Salta Province